Luphers Run is a tributary of Kern Run in Snyder County, Pennsylvania, in the United States. The stream is impacted by acid deposition, low pH, low dissolved oxygen nutrients, and organic enrichment. However, wild trout naturally reproduce in it. A vernal pool system is located nearby. Flooding has been known to occur along the stream.

Course
Luphers Run begins on a large ridge in Beaver Township. It flows north-northwest for several tenths of a mile before receiving an unnamed tributary from Bear Spring on the right. The stream then continues flowing north-northwest for more than a mile before reaching the bottom of the ridge. At this point, it turns northwest for a few tenths of a mile and enters Beavertown. In Beavertown, the stream turns north-northwest for a few tenths of a mile, crossing US Route 522 and reaching its confluence with Kern Run.

Hydrology
Luphers Run is designated as an impaired waterbody. The cause of the impairment is nutrients and organic enrichment/low dissolved oxygen. The likely source of the impairment is municipal point source discharges. Additionally, the headwaters of the stream are impacted by acid deposition and low pH.

The Beavertown Municipal Authority is authorized to discharge sewage from the Beavertown Municipal Authority Sewage Plant into Luphers Run. Their permit to do so will expire in 2020.

Geography and geology

Watershed
The mouth of the stream is in the United States Geological Survey quadrangle of Beavertown. However its source is in the quadrangle of Beaver Springs.

The designated use for Luphers Run is aquatic life.

Flooding has been known to occur on Luphers Run in Beavertown and Beaver Township.

History
Luphers Run was entered into the Geographic Names Information System on August 2, 1979. Its identifier in the Geographic Names Information System is 1180080.

Luphers Run has been used as a water supply for the borough of Beavertown.

Biology
Wild trout naturally reproduce in Luphers Run from its headwaters downstream to its mouth.

A site known as the Beavertown Vernal Pools is located in the vicinity of Luphers Run. The vernal pools are listed on the Snyder County Natural Heritage Inventory.

See also
Wetzel Run, next tributary of Kern Run going downstream
List of rivers of Pennsylvania

References

Rivers of Snyder County, Pennsylvania
Tributaries of the Susquehanna River
Rivers of Pennsylvania